Pyreferra hesperidago, the mustard sallow, is a species of cutworm or dart moth in the family Noctuidae. It is found in North America.

The MONA or Hodges number for Pyreferra hesperidago is 9929.

References

Further reading

 
 
 

Xylenini
Articles created by Qbugbot
Moths described in 1852